This is a timeline of Intel, one of the world's largest semiconductor chip makers.

Timeline

References 

Intel
Intel